Raorchestes manipurensis or Leimatak's bush frog is a species of frog of the genus Raorchestes found around the Tumzane river near Leimatak, Churachandpur district in the state of Manipur in India. The species was discovered in 2008 and is named after "Leimatek" in Manipur, its type locality.

References

External links
 

manipurensis
Frogs of India
Endemic fauna of Manipur
Amphibians described in 2009